E-Corce was a planned remote sensing satellite constellation of CNES, slated for launch in 2014.

Designed by an engineer from CNES, JP Antikidis, in the frame of a prospective unit led by JJ Favier, this project is revolutionizing satellite Earth observation methodologies by allowing at acceptable cost a rapid coverage of the entire planet (1 day to 1 week) with high resolution (metric) color pictures. The solutions use image compression (psycho-visual) coupled with new methods of receiving and processing information distributed across the planet. The project aims by 2014 to photograph all of the continents in color at a resolution of 1 meter, every week, with a constellation of 13 Earth-orbiting microsatellites at 600 km, imaging everything in their path and down-linking compressed data to processing centers on the world.

Definition: "e-Constellation of Observation by Recurrent Cellular Environment" combining of three technological "cells"(space, telecom, Grid) to produce a multi-spectral image of the Earth. "e" as intended to feed the new vectors of the mass-based Internet, "Constellation" because relying on a constellation of satellites observing the earth in "saturation" REcurrent "because based on a systematic information delivery high resolution refreshed daily to weekly "Cellular " because using the combined virtues of new technology based on cellular processing (Wide Area Grid) distributed across the full globe.

References
The one meter shop concept e-CORCE, J.P.Antikidis and Al. Acta Astronautica Volume 63, Issues 1-4, July–August 2008, Pages 156-164

Earth imaging satellites